Olivia Gail O'Brien (born November 26, 1999) is an American singer-songwriter. In 2016, after she collaborated with Gnash on the single "I Hate U, I Love U", the pair peaked at number 10 on the Billboard Hot 100 chart in the United States and number one in Australia, resulting in a recording contract with Island Records. Her debut studio album, Was It Even Real?, was released in April 2019. Her single "Josslyn", a part of her EP The Results of My Poor Judgement, became popular on the media-sharing app TikTok and is another one of her well-known works.

Early life
Olivia Gail O'Brien was born on November 26, 1999, in Thousand Oaks, California. She has been singing since she was seven years old, and taught herself to play guitar and piano. She attended Justin-Siena High School in Napa, California. She also skipped a grade (3rd), and attended Montessori and Catholic schools in her youth. O'Brien also was bullied as a teenager, some of it stemming from her social class and the fact she was creating music.

Career

2013–2019: Breakthrough and Was It Even Real?

O'Brien initially gained the attention of Gnash after posting a cover of one of his songs on SoundCloud, after beginning to create music at the age of 13. Gnash reached out to O'Brien, expressing interest in her material, and asked for her to send him any original songs that she had. O'Brien then sent a voice note of her original song, "I Hate U, Love U", and he invited her to record the song with him in Los Angeles. "I Hate U, I Love U" (stylized in lowercase) was released in March 2016, and appears on Gnash's third EP titled Us. The single peaked at number 10 on the Billboard Hot 100 and reached number one in Australia. Thereafter, O'Brien signed with Island Records and released her debut solo single, "Trust Issues", in August 2016, which premiered through Complex magazine. Her second single, "Root Beer Float" featuring Blackbear, premiered on September 15, 2016. O'Brien released a third single, "Find What You're Looking For", in October 2016. O'Brien released "Hate U, Love U" as a single in December, the original solo version of "I Hate U, I Love U". O'Brien also released an acoustic video for the song on December 20, 2016. O'Brien made her television debut in July 2016 with Gnash performing "I Hate U, I Love U" on Late Night with Seth Meyers. O'Brien and Gnash made their second television performance on September 19, 2016, performing "i hate u, i love u" on Today.

In February 2017, O'Brien released "Empty" as the lead single from her debut extended play. In March 2017, O'Brien was nominated for an iHeartRadio Music Award for Best Solo Breakout, but lost to Zayn Malik. She released the next single from the EP in July, "RIP", with accompanying music video. The third single, "No Love", followed in November along with her debut extended play, It's Not That Deep. O'Brien featured in the acoustic version of Jack & Jack's single "Beg", released in January 2018. In June 2018, a remix of "RIP" was released with the collaboration of G-Eazy and Drew Love. In August 2018, "UDK" was released as the first promotional single from O'Brien's debut studio album. O'Brien released the lead single, "I Don't Exist", in September, followed by "Care Less More" in November, both with accompanying music videos. The third single, "Love Myself", was released on February 1, 2019. In March, O'Brien announced that her debut studio album, Was It Even Real?, was scheduled for release on April 26, 2019. She then released "Just Friends" as the second promotional single, and "Just a Boy", as the final single before the release of the album. In May 2019, O'Brien collaborated with the Norwegian group Seeb on "Fade Out". The single was accompanied by a music video.

2019–2020: Micromixtapes

On November 15, 2019, she released a project called It Was a Sad Fucking Summer as the first release from a series of "micro-mixtapes" leading to her next album. She also announced a tour, It Was a Sad F**king Tour, beginning in February 2020. On February 6, 2020, O'Brien released her second micro-mixtape, The Results Of My Poor Judgement. In April 2020, O'Brien was set to perform at Coachella Festival, which was later canceled due to the COVID-19 pandemic. A track from the tape called "Josslyn" gained traction on streaming services and radio airplay when users on TikTok began doing dance challenges to the song. A "quarantine" music video shot at O'Brien's house in isolation during the COVID-19 pandemic was released on May 8. The single would be re-released on the Josslyn EP which included the original version of the song, a remix, a demo of the song and a radio edit on May 15. A remix with rapper 24kGoldn was released on May 22, whilst the original song was serviced to top 40 radio formats on June 2. 

On September 18, 2020 O'Brien released a single titled "Now" along with a music video.

2021: Episodes 
O'Brien released the single, "Better Than Feeling Lonely" on January 1, 2021. On April 9, 2021, O'Brien released "Sociopath" as the lead single for her scrapped album following an online fan vote between it and "Bitch Back", which was later released, featuring FLETCHER on August 5th, 2022. The first part of what would have been her second studio album was released on June 11, 2021, under the name Episodes: Season 1. The track "No More Friends" features from Oli Sykes. To support the project, O'Brien embarked on The Olivia O'Brien Show tour in the fall of 2021. However, Olivia decided to take a step back on the release of the second half of the album for now, saying she "[doesn't] want to worry about making a project right now", and that she's "just putting out songs at this point" on the Zach Sang Show. However, she has also said that "if at some point [her team and her] want to compile [the upcoming songs] together", they could make that compilation into Episodes: Season 2.

Discography

Studio albums

Extended plays

Mixtapes

Singles

As lead artist

As featured artist

Promotional singles

Songwriting credits

Awards and nominations

References

External links

 

1999 births
Living people
21st-century American women singers
American women singer-songwriters
American women pop singers
Singers from Los Angeles
Trip hop musicians
Island Records artists
21st-century American singers
Singer-songwriters from California